Australisis is a genus of deep-sea bamboo coral  in the family Isididae. It is monotypic with a single species, Australisis sarmentosa.

References

Isididae
Octocorallia genera